Abdullah Mohamed al-Dawood is a Saudi author, known for self-help books and conservative views.

In May 2013, his Twitter comment about the harassment of working women generated negative international publicity. al-Dawood argued that his comment was misunderstood due to mistranslation and misquoting.

References

Saudi Arabian writers
Twitter controversies
2013 controversies
Living people
Year of birth missing (living people)